Maximum retail price (MRP) is a manufacturer calculated price that is the highest price that can be charged for a product sold in India and Bangladesh.

About 
However, the retailers may choose to sell products for less than the MRP. MRP differs from systems using a recommended retail price because in those systems the price calculated by the manufacturer is only a recommendation, not enforceable by law.

All retail products in India must be marked with MRP. Shops cannot charge customers over the MRP. Some shops may charge slightly below MRP to draw more customers to their stores. In some remote areas, tourist spots, and in situations where a product is difficult to obtain, consumers are often charged illegally over the MRP.

In April 2015, it was reported that milk vendors in Mumbai were threatening a boycott after it was discovered they had been charging above MRP and the Maharashtra state government threatened to intervene.

Criticism
The concept of MRP has been criticized as incompatible with the free market system, because it involves manufacturers deciding what profit retailers will make. It is easy to get around the MRP by charging for 'services' on top of the item price, such as a 'cooling charge' for cold drinks, or by manufacturers setting the MRP at up to ten times the expected sale price. The MRP also hurts consumers in rural areas because if retailers cannot charge a higher price to make up for the higher cost of transportation and distribution to those areas, they may simply not stock many items.

Unit sale price 
From 2022 onwards USP will be displayed along with MRP.

See also
Recommended retail price
Resale price maintenance

References

Anti-competitive practices
Competition (economics)
Retail pricing
Retailing in India
Retailing in Bangladesh